This list includes the appointment date and performance record of current NRL Women's senior coaches. The league consists of six clubs across Australia.

Kelvin Wright, the senior coach of the Brisbane Broncos, has coached the most matches with 14. He is also the longest serving coach, having led the Broncos since 2019 NRL Women's season.

Coaches

See also 

 List of current NRL coaches

Notes

References 

NRL Women's
NRL Women's coaches
Coaches
Women's coaches
NRL coaches